The Glades is a one-hour drama that ran on A&E from July 11, 2010 to August 26, 2013. The premiere was the highest-rated episode of an original series to be shown on A&E.

The show's premise involves a Chicago detective taking a South Florida job with the Florida Department of Law Enforcement, which he believes will afford a more relaxing lifestyle, but he finds things are more complicated than he imagined.

On August 31, 2013, A&E canceled The Glades after four seasons.

Series overview 
{| class="wikitable plainrowheaders" style="text-align: center;"
 |-
 ! style="padding:0 8px;" colspan="2" rowspan="2"| Season
 ! style="padding:0 8px;" rowspan="2"| Episodes
 ! colspan="2"| Originally aired
 |-
 ! style="padding: 0 8px;" |First aired
 ! Last aired
 |-
 |style="background: #4E5E1D;"| 
 |1
 |13
 |
 |style="padding: 0 8px;"| 
 |-
 |style="background: #003377;"| 
 |2
 |13
 |
 |style="padding: 0 8px;"| 
 |-
 |style="background: #FF7E00;"| 
 |3
 |10
 |
 |
 |-
 |style="background: #A92323;"| 
 |4
 |13
 |
 |
|}

Episodes

Season 1 (2010)

Season 2 (2011)

Season 3 (2012)

Season 4 (2013)

Ratings

References

External links 
 
 
 List of The Glades episodes at TheFutoncritic.com
 List of The Glades episodes at MSN.TV

Glades